3-Methylheptane is a branched alkane isomeric to octane. Its structural formula is CH3CH2CH(CH3)CH2CH2CH2CH3. It has one stereocenter.

Its refractive index is 1.398 (20 °C, D).

References

External links
Non-stereospecific oxidation of DL-3-methylheptane by aPseudomonas

Alkanes